Ron Critchley (born 16 December 1940) is a former  Australian rules footballer who played with Hawthorn in the Victorian Football League (VFL).

Notes

External links 

When Murmungee made the news! via On Reflection

Living people
1940 births
Australian rules footballers from Victoria (Australia)
Hawthorn Football Club players